Conclave is a 2016 novel by British writer Robert Harris. The book is set in the context of the death of a pope and the subsequent papal conclave to elect his successor.

References

2016 novels
Novels by Robert Harris